Rajić is a South Slavic surname. Notable people with the name include:

 Blaško Rajić (1878–1951), Croatian priest, writer and politician
 Ema Rajić (born 2000), Croatian swimmer
 Ivica Rajić (born 1958), Bosnian Croat army commander
 Jovan Rajić (1726–1801), Serbian writer and historian
 Ljubiša Rajić (1947–2012), Serbian linguist and translator
 Marko Rajić (born 1991), Serbian football player
 Mihael Rajić (born 1984), Croatian football player
 Nenad Rajić (born 1982), Serbian football player
 Predrag Rajić (born 1987), Serbian politician
 Tanasko Rajić (1754–1815), Serbian revolutionary
 Velimir Rajić (1879–1915), Serbian poet

Croatian surnames
Serbian surnames